Benin will compete at the 2022 World Athletics Championships in Eugene, United States, from 15 to 24 July 2022. Benin has entered 2 athletes.

Results

Women 
Track and road events

Combined events – Heptathlon

References

World Championships in Athletics
2022
Nations at the 2022 World Athletics Championships